Thomas de Cantilupe (25 August 1282; also spelled Cantelow, Cantelou, Canteloupe, Latinised to de Cantilupo) was Lord Chancellor of England and Bishop of Hereford. He was canonised in 1320 by Pope John XXII.

Origins
Thomas was the third son of William II de Cantilupe (died 1251) (anciently Cantelow, Cantelou, Canteloupe, etc, Latinised to de Cantilupo), 2nd feudal baron of Eaton Bray in Bedfordshire, who was steward of the household to King Henry III (as his father William I de Cantilupe (died 1239) had been to Henry's father King John). Thomas's mother was Millicent (or Maud) de Gournai (died 1260), a daughter of Hugh de Gournai and widow of Amaury VI of Montfort-Évreux (died 1213), Earl of Gloucester. He was born at Hambleden in Buckinghamshire, a manor belonging to his mother's first husband but awarded to her during her lifetime as her dowry. Thomas's uncle was Walter de Cantilupe (died 1266), Bishop of Worcester.

Career
Cantilupe was educated at Oxford, Paris and Orléans, and was a teacher of canon law at the University of Oxford, where he became Chancellor in 1261.

During the Second Barons' War, Cantilupe favoured Simon de Montfort and the baronial party. He represented the barons before King Louis IX of France at Amiens in 1264.

On 25 February 1264, when he was Archdeacon of Stafford, Cantilupe was made Lord Chancellor of England, but was deprived of the office after de Montfort's death at the Battle of Evesham, and lived abroad for a while. Following his return to England, he was again appointed Chancellor of Oxford University, where he lectured on theology and held several ecclesiastical appointments.

Bishop of Hereford

In 1274 Cantilupe attended the Second Council of Lyons and on 14 June 1275 he was appointed Bishop of Hereford, being consecrated on 8 September 1275.

Cantilupe was now a trusted adviser of King Edward I and when attending royal councils at Windsor Castle or at Westminster he lived at Earley in Berkshire. Even when differing from the king's opinions, he did not forfeit his favour.

Cantilupe had a "great conflict" in 1290 with the "Red Earl", Gilbert de Clare, 7th Earl of Gloucester, 6th Earl of Hertford, concerning hunting rights in Malvern, Worcestershire, and a ditch dug by de Clare. The issue was settled by costly litigation.

After the death in 1279 of Robert Kilwardby, Archbishop of Canterbury, a friend of Cantilupe's, and formerly his confessor, a series of disputes arose between him and John Peckham, the new archbishop. The disagreements culminated in Peckham excommunicating Cantilupe, who proceeded to Rome to pursue the matter with the pope.

Death, burial, and canonization

Cantilupe died at Ferento, near Orvieto, in Italy, on 25 August 1282. He is buried in Hereford Cathedral. Part of the evidence used in his cause of canonization was the supposed raising from the dead of William Cragh, a Welsh rebel who was hanged in 1290, eight years after Cantilupe's death. A papal inquiry was convened in London on 20 April 1307 to determine whether or not Cantilupe had died excommunicate, since this would have precluded his being canonized. Forty-four witnesses were called and various letters produced, before the commissioners of the inquiry concluded that Cantilupe had been absolved in Rome before his death. It was difficult for his cause of death to be determined as much of his body had disintegrated.

After a papal investigation lasting almost 13 years, Cantilupe was canonized by Pope John XXII on 17 April 1320. His feast day was fixed on 2 October. His shrine became a popular place of pilgrimage, but only its base survived the Reformation until a new upper section (a feretory) was recently recreated under the guidance of architect Robert Chitham.  The new section is in vivid colours with a painted scene of the Virgin and Child holding the Mappa Mundi. A reliquary containing his skull has been held at Downside Abbey in Somerset since 1881.

In the current Latin edition of the Roman Martyrology (2004 edition), Cantilupe is listed under 25 August as follows: "At Montefiascone in Tuscia, the passing of Saint Thomas Cantelupe, Bishop of Hereford in England, who, resplendent with learning, severe toward himself, to the poor however showed himself a generous benefactor".

Legacy
Cantilupe appears to have been an exemplary bishop in both spiritual and secular affairs. His charities were large and his private life blameless. He was constantly visiting his diocese, correcting offenders and discharging other episcopal duties, and he compelled neighbouring landholders to restore estates which rightly belonged to the see of Hereford. Cantilupe has been lauded as the "Father of Modern Charity," and is cited as an inspiration by Mother Teresa and Melinda Gates.

The Cantilupe Society was a text publication society founded in 1905 to publish the episcopal registers of the See of Hereford, of which Cantilupe's is the earliest to survive, and other records relating to the cathedral and diocese. It fell into abeyance after 1932.

Cantilupe is referenced in Graham Greene's novel Travels With My Aunt (1969), when the narrator's sharp-tongued aunt opines "I would have thought he was very lucky to die in Orvieto rather than in Hereford. A small civilized place even today with a far, far better climate and an excellent restaurant in the Via Garibaldi."

Notes

Citations

References

External links
 Royal Berkshire History: St. Thomas Cantilupe of Hereford
 Catholic Encyclopedia
 Catholic Online Saints and Angels
 Pilgrimage page at Hereford Cathedral
 Stirnet: CZmisc02 

1210s births
1282 deaths
Anglo-Normans
13th-century Christian saints
13th-century English Roman Catholic bishops
Academics of the University of Oxford
Archdeacons of Stafford
Bishops of Hereford
Burials at Hereford Cathedral
Canon law jurists
Chancellors of the University of Oxford
English legal scholars
English Roman Catholic saints
Lord chancellors of England
Medieval English saints
People from Hambleden
Legal scholars of the University of Oxford
13th-century English lawyers
De Cantilupe family

Year of birth uncertain